This Must Be the Place is a 1985 album by British jazz rock duo Morrissey–Mullen.

Track listing 

"A Tear for Crystal"
"Mean Time"
"This Must Be the Place"
"With You"
"Southend Pierre"
"Visions"
"All I Want to Do"

Personnel 

Dick Morrissey - saxes
Jim Mullen - guitar
Noel McCalla - vocals
Chris Fletcher - percussion
Neal Wilkinson - drums
Pete Jacobsen - keyboards
Trevor Barry - bass

References 

1985 albums
Morrissey–Mullen albums